The Obelisk of Glory is a monument in Tolyatti's Liberty Square to the heroes of World War II (called, in Russia, the Great Patriotic War).

Creation
Due to the construction of the Zhiguli Hydroelectric Station in the early 1950s, the town of Stavropol (renamed Tolyatti in 1964) fell into the flooding zone of the new Kuybyshev Reservoir on the Volga River and was completely rebuilt on a new site.

Part of the plan for relocating Stavropol was to be an area dedicated to the memory of the poet Alexander Pushkin. But in April 1957, some young builders proposed to instead erect a monument to the fighters of the Great Patriotic War, at their own expense. 30,000 rubles were amassed by collecting waste paper, scrap metal, and so forth.

A design competition was held, won by Mikhail Sorokin, who was awarded a ticket to the 6th World Festival of Youth and Students in Moscow.

Sorokin's design was a classic four-sided stele. Three sides depict fighters of the Great Patriotic War who were residents of Stavropol (pilot Victor Nosov, infantry soldier Vasily Zhilin, and seaman Eugene Nikonov) while the fourth depicts Vasily Banykin (1888–1918), an earlier figure, a former Chairman of the Executive Committee of the Stavropol City Council (equivalent to mayor) who was instrumental in establishing revolutionary power in Stavropol and who had been shot during the evacuation of the city in the face of the advancing Czechoslovak Legion.

The opening ceremony for the monument was October 26, 1958. Since that day, Liberty Square has been a central place of the city, and the name is also now used for the surrounding area. Since November 7, 1958, city celebrations and demonstrations have been held there. The adjacent parkway was named Youth Boulevard.

Restoration

In preparation for the 30th anniversary of victory in the Great Patriotic War, in April 1975 the obelisk was restored and altered.

The four stone balls and the decorative chains at the perimeter were removed, and the monument was faced with granite. The existing medallions were replaced with bas-relief profiles of the heroes in bronze executed by Tolyatti artists A. N. Pronyushkin and N. Kolesnikov. On one side of the stele was placed a plaque with the inscription

The phrase "Champions who died for the freedom and happiness of the people" was also added.

On November 3, 1978 the eternal flame was lit at the monument, delivered by an armored personnel carrier from the flame at the Obelisk of Glory in Samara. After this, the Toylatti monument gradually also came to be referred to as the Obelisk of Glory.

In 2006, the mayor of Tolyatti, Nikolai Utkin, declared his intention to refurbish the monument.

External links

Further reading
 

Monuments and memorials built in the Soviet Union
Obelisks in Russia
World War II memorials in Russia
Monuments and memorials in Tolyatti
Buildings and structures completed in 1958
Cultural heritage monuments in Samara Oblast